Smith is one of the most common surnames in the English-speaking world.  Following is a list of notable people with the surname Smith.

People known primarily as having the surname Smith

Common combinations of given name and surname Smith

Aaron Smith
Abel Smith
Abraham Smith
Abram Smith
Adam Smith
Adrian Smith
Al Smith
Alan Smith
Albert Smith
Alex Smith
Alexander Smith
Alfred Smith
Alice Smith
Allison (or Alison) Smith
Alvin Smith
Amanda Smith
Amy Smith
Andre Smith
Andrea Smith
Andrew (or Andy) Smith
Angela Smith
Anna Smith
Anne Smith
Annie Smith
Anthony Smith
Antonio Smith
April Smith
Archibald Smith
Archie Smith
Arnold Smith
Art Smith
Arthur Smith
Ashley Smith
Augustus Smith
Austin Smith
Barbara Smith
Barry Smith
Ben (or Benjamin) Smith
Bernard (or Bernie) Smith
Bert Smith
Betty Smith
For Bill or Billy Smith, see William Smith
For Bob or Bobby Smith, see Robert Smith
Brad (or Bradley) Smith
Brandon Smith
Brendan Smith
Brian Smith
Brooke Smith
Bruce Smith
Bryan Smith
Bud Smith
Caleb Smith
Cameron Smith
Carl Smith
Cary Smith
Catherine (or Cathy or Katherine) Smith
Cecil Smith
Cedric Smith
Chad Smith
Charles (or Charlie) Smith
Charlotte Smith
Chris Smith
Christian Smith
Christina Smith
Christine Smith
Christopher Smith
Chuck Smith
Clarence Smith
Clark Smith
Clay Smith
Clement Smith
Clifford Smith
Clifton Smith
Clive Smith
Clyde Smith
Colin Smith
Corey Smith
Courtney Smith
Craig Smith
Curt Smith
Cyril Smith
Dale Smith
Damian Smith
Damien Smith
Dan Smith
Daniel Smith
Danny Smith
Darren Smith
Daryl (or Darryl, or Darrell) Smith
Dave Smith
David Smith
Dean Smith
Debbie (or Deborah) Smith
Denis Smith
Dennis Smith
Derek Smith
Derrick Smith
Des (or Desmond) Smith
Devin (or Devon) Smith
Dick Smith
Dominic Smith
Don Smith
Donald Smith
Donna Smith
Douglas (or Doug) Smith
Drew Smith
Dwight Smith
Dylan Smith
Earl Smith
Ed Smith
Edgar Smith
Edith Smith
Edmund Smith
Edward Smith
Edwin Smith
Elaine Smith
Elbert Smith
Elijah Smith
Elizabeth Smith
Ella Smith
Elmer Smith
Eloise Smith
Emily Smith
Emma Smith
Emmanuel Smith
Eric Smith
Ernest Smith
Ernie Smith
Ethan Smith
Ethel Smith
Eugene Smith
Fiona Smith
Floyd Smith
Frances Smith
Francis Smith
Frank Smith
Fred (or Frederic, or Frederick Smith)
Gary Smith
Gavin Smith
Gene Smith
Geoff Smith
Geoffrey Smith
George Smith
Gerald Smith
Gerard Smith
Glen Smith
Gordon Smith
Graeme Smith
Graham Smith
Grant Smith
Gregory (or Greg) Smith
Guy Smith
Hal Smith
Hamilton Smith
Hank Smith
Hannah Smith
Harold Smith
Harrison Smith
Harry Smith
Harvey Smith
Hayley Smith
Helen Smith
Henry Smith
Herbert Smith
Hilda Smith
Holly Smith
Horace Smith
Howard Smith
Hugh Smith
Humphrey Smith
Hyrum Smith
Ian (or Iain) Smith
Ira Smith
Isaac Smith
Ivor Smith
J. T. Smith
Jack Smith
Jackie Smith
Jacob Smith
Jake Smith
James Smith
Jamie Smith
Jane Smith
Janet Smith
Jason Smith
Jay Smith
Jaylen Smith
Jean Smith
Jeff Smith
Jennifer Smith
Jeremiah Smith
Jeremy Smith
Jerome Smith
Jerry Smith
Jesse Smith
Jessica Smith
Jessie Smith
Jim Smith
Jimmy Smith
Joan Smith
John Smith
Johnny Smith
Johnson Smith
Jonathan Smith
Jordan Smith
Joseph (or Joe) Smith
Josiah Smith
Joshua (or Josh) Smith
Julia Smith
Julian Smith
Julie Smith
June Smith
Justin Smith
Karen Smith
Karl Smith
Kate Smith
Katherine (or Catherine, or Cathy) Smith
Kathleen Smith
Kathy Smith
Kay Smith
Keith Smith
Kelly Smith
Kenneth (or Kenny, or Ken) Smith
Kent Smith
Kevin Smith
Kim Smith
Kirsten Smith
Kyle Smith
Lamar Smith
Lance Smith
Larry Smith
Laura Smith
Lauren Smith
Lawrence Smith
Leah Smith
Lee Smith
Leighton Smith
Lemuel Smith
Leo Smith
Leon Smith
Leonard (or Len) Smith
Leroy Smith
Leslie Smith
Lester Smith
Lewis Smith
Liam Smith
Lillian Smith
Linda Smith
Lisa Smith
Liz Smith
Lonnie Smith
Louis Smith
Lucy Smith
Luke Smith
Malcolm Smith
Marc Smith
Marcus Smith
Margaret (or Maggie) Smith
Maria Smith
Mark Smith
Marshall Smith
Martha Smith
Martin Smith
Martyn Smith
Mary Smith
Matthew (or Matt) Smith
Maurice Smith
May Smith
Melanie Smith
Melvin (or Mel) Smith
Michael (or Mike) Smith
Michelle Smith
Morgan Smith
Murray Smith
Nate Smith
Nathan Smith
Neil Smith
Neville Smith
Nicholas Smith
Nick Smith
Nigel Smith
Noel Smith
Norman Smith
Olive Smith
Oliver Smith
Oscar Smith
Otis Smith
Owen Smith
Paddy Smith
Pat Smith
Patricia (or Patti) Smith
Patrick Smith
Paul Smith
Percy Smith
Perry Smith
Pete Smith
Peter Smith
Philip (or Phil) Smith
Preston Smith
R. B. Smith
Ralph Smith
Randall (or Randal) Smith
Randy Smith
Rashad Smith
Ray Smith
Raymond Smith
Rebecca Smith
Red Smith
Regan Smith
Reginald (or Reggie, or Reg) Smith
Richard (or Rick, or Ricky) Smith
Rick Smith
Robert (or Rob, Bob, or Bobby) Smith
Robin Smith
Rod (or Rodney, or Roderick) Smith
Roger Smith
Ron Smith
Ronnie Smith
Ross Smith
Roy Smith
Rupert Smith
Russell Smith
Rusty Smith
Ruth Smith
Ryan Smith
Sally Smith
Sam (or Samuel) Smith
Samantha Smith
Sandra Smith
Sarah Smith
Scott Smith
Sean Smith
Shane Smith
Shannon Smith
Sharon Smith
Shaun Smith
Shelley Smith
Shirley Smith
Sid Smith
Sidney Smith
Simon Smith
Sinclair Smith
Sophia Smith
Spencer Smith
Stan Smith
Steven (or Stephen, or Steve) Smith
Stewart Smith
Stuart Smith
Sue Smith
Susan Smith
Sydney Smith
Sylvester Smith
Tara Smith
Ted Smith
Terence Smith
Terry Smith
Thomas Smith
Tim Smith
Toby Smith
Todd Smith
Tom Smith
Tommy Smith
Tony Smith
Tracy Smith
Travis Smith
Trevor Smith
Trey Smith
Troy Smith
Ty Smith
Tyler Smith
Tyrone Smith
Tyson Smith
Vernon Smith
Victor Smith
Vincent (or Vince, or Vinnie) Smith
Violet Smith
Virgil Smith
Virginia Smith
Vivian Smith
Wallace Smith
Wally Smith
Walter Smith
Warren Smith
Wayne Smith
Wendy Smith
Wilbur Smith
Wilf (or Wilfred) Smith 
Will Smith
Willard Smith
William (or Bill, Billy, Will, Willie, or Willy) Smith
Wilma Smith
Winston Smith
Zachary (or Zac, Zach, or Zack) Smith
Zoe Smith

Less ambiguous notable individuals

A 
A. Hyatt Smith (1814–1892), American politician
A. Ledyard Smith (1901–1985), American archaeologist
Abby Hadassah Smith (1797–1879), American suffragist
Abigail Smith (fl. 1990s–2010s), New Zealand academic
Abram D. Smith (1811–1865), American jurist
Ahmaad Smith (born 1983), American football player
AJ Smith, American songwriter and muscian
Akili Smith (born 1975), Canadian and American football player
Albert Hugh Smith (1903–1967), English philologist
Aldon Smith (born 1989), American football player
Ali Smith (born 1962), Scottish novelist and writer
Ambrose Smith (died 1584) English textile merchant and landowner
Anna Nicole Smith (1967–2007), American model and television personality
Anno Smith (1915–1990), Dutch ceramist, painter and sculptor
Arabella Smith, Turks and Caicos Islands politician
Argile Smith (born 1955), clergyman and interim university president
Árón Smith (born 1989), Irish racing driver
Ashbel Smith (1805–1886), father of the University of Texas, politician, doctor
August E. Smith (1879–1969), American politician and educator

B 
Bella Smith (born 2001), Australian rules footballer
Bessie Smith (1894–1937), American blues singer
Braden Smith (born 1996), American football player
Brandt Smith (born 1959), Arkansas state legislator
Bruton Smith (1927–2022), American car racing promoter and CEO
Bubba Smith (1945–2011), American football player and actor
Burch Smith (born 1990), American baseball player

C 
C. Aubrey Smith (1863–1948), English cricketer and actor
Cal Smith (1932–2013), American country singer
Caleb Blood Smith (1808–1864), American journalist and politician who served in Abraham Lincoln's Cabinet during the American Civil War
Charitie Lees Smith (1741–1823), Irish hymnwriter, religious writer
Chloe Smith (born 1982), Conservative Party politician
Chloe Smith (musician) (born c. ), American lead singer of the musical group Rising Appalachia
Christen Smith (1785–1816), Norwegian naturalist, whose name is sometimes spelled Christian Smith or Chretien Smith
Cleo Smith (born 2017/2018), Australian child who went missing and made headlines around the word.
Connie Smith (born 1941), American musician
Conrad Smith (born 1981), New Zealand rugby player
Constance Smith (1929-2003), Irish actor
Cordwainer Smith (pen name; 1913–1966), American science fiction author
Cotesworth P. Smith (1807–1862), Justice of the Supreme Court of Mississippi

D 
Dallas Smith (born 1977), Canadian singer and songwriter
Dallas Smith (ice hockey) (born 1941), Canadian ice hockey defenceman
Dallis Smith (born 1965), American football player
Dalton Smith (born 1997), British boxer
D'Ante Smith (born 1998), American football player
Delazon Smith (1816–1860), American politician
Delbert K. Smith (1862–1905), American politician
Delia Smith (born 1941), British television cook
DeMaurice Smith (born 1964), American lawyer and labor official
Dena A. Smith (1899–1968), American politician
Derron Smith (born 1992), American football player
De'Veon Smith (born 1994), American football player
Devon Smith (born 1981), Grenadian cricketer
DeVonta Smith (born 1998), American football player
Dewey Smith (1972–2009), American aquanaut
Digby Smith (born 1935), British military historian
Dinitia Smith (born 1945), American author and filmmaker
D'Joun Smith (born 1992), American football player
Dodie Smith (1896–1990), English novelist and playwright
Donta Smith (born 1983), professional basketball player, 2014 Israeli Basketball Premier League MVP
Dudley Smith (1926–2016), British politician
Dwayne Smith (born 1983), Barbadian cricketer

E 
Eben Smith (1832–1906), American businessman
Edmund Kirby Smith (1824–1893), American general
E. E. Smith (1890–1965), American science fiction author
Egerton Smith (1774–1841), British publisher
Elerson Smith (born 1998), American football player
Elihu Hubbard Smith (1771–1798), American physician and man of letters
Elliott Smith (1969–2003), American singer-songwriter
Ellison D. Smith (1864–1944), American politician who represented South Carolina in the United States Senate
Elske Smith (born 1929), Dutch-American astronomer
Emmitt Smith (born 1969), American football player
Erik Smith (1931–2004), German-born British record producer, pianist and harpsichordist
Erwin Frink Smith (1854–1927), American bacteriologist
Estelle Turrell Smith (1854–after 1896), American social reformer
Eugénie M. Rayé-Smith (1871-1914), American lawyer and suffragist
Eva Munson Smith (1843–1915), American composer, poet, author

G 
Garth Smith (born 1955), bassist
Garth Smith (musician, born 1960), LDS musician
Geno Smith (born 1990), American football player
Germany Smith (1863–1927), 19th-century American baseball player
Gerrit Smith (1797–1874), philanthropist, abolitionist, U.S. Representative from New York
Gertrude Smith (1894–1985), American classicist
Giles Alexander Smith (1829–1876), Union general in the American Civil War
Givani Smith (born 1998), Canadian ice hockey player
Grace Cossington Smith (1892–1984), Australian artist
Granger Smith (born 1979), American country music singer                  
Graeme Smith (born 1981), South African cricketer
Gretchen Smith (fl. 2010s), New York City Ballet dancer
Griffin Smith (1885–1955), Chief Justice of the Arkansas Supreme Court

H 
Hart F. Smith (born 1962), American mathematician
Herman L. Smith (1892–1950), American mathematician
Harvest Smith (born 1963), American basketball player
Hayden Smith (born 1985), Australian player of American football
Haydon Smith (1901–1948), English cricketer
Hobart Muir Smith (1912–2013), US-American herpetologist
Hoke L. Smith (1931–2004), American university president
Honor Smith (1908–1995), English neurologist
Hooley Smith (1903–1963), Canadian ice hockey player
Huey "Piano" Smith (1934–2023), American R&B pianist

I 
Irv Smith Jr. (born 1998), American football player
Irving Smith (RAF officer) (1917–2000), New Zealand flying ace
Ito Smith (born 1995), American football player

J 
Jabari Smith (born 1977), American basketball player
Jabari Smith Jr. (born 2003), American basketball player
Jaclyn Smith (born 1945), American actress
Jacqui Smith (born 1962), British politician
Jada Pinkett Smith (born 1971), American actress and Will Smith's wife
Jaden Smith (born 1998), American actor, son of actor Will Smith
Jaleen Smith (born 1994), American basketball player
Jalen Smith (born 2000), American basketball player
Jamill Smith (born 1991), American football player
Jasper Smith (born 1965), English entrepreneur
Jasper K. Smith (1905–1992), American politician
Jaylon Smith (born 1995), American football player
Jedediah Smith (1799–1831), American frontiersman, explorer, cartographer and writer
J'Mar Smith (born 1996), American football player
Jonnu Smith (born 1995), American football player
Joy Smith (born 1947), Canadian House of Commons member
J. R. Smith (born 1985), American basketball player
Justice Smith (born 1995), American film and television actor

K 
Kaden Smith (born 1997), American football player
Karin Smith (born 1955), American javelin thrower
Katie Smith (born 1974), American basketball player
Keely Smith (1928–2017), American singer
Kermit Smith (fl. 2000s–2020s), American college baseball player and coach
Kerr Smith (born 1972), American actor
Kion Smith (born 1998), American football player
Klondike Smith (1887–1959), English baseball player
Kobe Smith (born 1998), American football player
Kurtwood Smith (born 1943), American actor

L 
L. J. Smith (born 1980), Philadelphia Eagles football player
Lane Smith (1936–2005), American actor
Larkin I. Smith (1944–1989), Mississippi politician
Lars Olsson Smith (1836–1913), Swedish distiller and politician
Laura Smith (blues singer) (1882–1932), American blues singer
Laurids Smith (1754–1794), Danish clergyman, philosopher and early animal rights writer
Laverne Smith (born 1954), US American football player
Lawrie Smith (born 1956), British sailor
Lecitus Smith (born 1998), American football player
Lenny Smith (born 1942), American singer, songwriter, and music publisher
Lenzelle Smith Jr. (born 1991), American basketball player in the Israeli Basketball Premier League
Leslee Smith (born 1990), British Virgin Islands basketball player
Loren A. Smith (born 1944), judge of the United States Court of Federal Claims
Lovie Smith (born 1958), American professional football coach
Lucille Elizabeth Bishop Smith (1892–1985), American entrepreneur, chef, and inventor
Lucky Blue Smith (born 1998), American model and musician
Luella Dowd Smith (1847–1941), American poet, author
Lura Eugenie Brown Smith (1864–?), American journalist, newspaper editor, author

M 
M. Hoke Smith (1855–1931), United States Secretary of the Interior
Maason Smith (born 2002), American football defensive tackle
Mabel Smith (1924–1972), American R&B singer better known as Big Maybelle
Macdonald Smith (1892–1949), Scottish–American professional golfer
Madeleine Smith (1835–1928), Scottish socialite and murder suspect
Madeline Smith (born 1949), English actress
Maisie Smith (born 2001), English actress and singer
Margo Smith (born 1942), American country music singer
Marguerite L. Smith (1894–1985), New York assemblywoman 1920–1921
Marilynn Smith (1929–2019), American golfer
Marva Smith (fl. 1970s–2010s), Manitoba judge
May Aimée Smith (1886–1962), English painter
Mayo Smith (1915–1977), American baseball player and manager
Mervyn Ashmore Smith (1904–1994), Australian artist
Mili Smith (born 1998), Scottish curler
Miriam Smith (swimmer) (born 1958), swimmer
Moses "Whispering" Smith (1932–1984), American blues harmonicist and singer

N 
Nana Smith (born 1971), American tennis player
Nellie von Gerichten Smith (1871–1952), American composer
Niki Smith, American author and cartoonist
Noland Smith (born 1943), American football player
Nora Archibald Smith (1859–1934), American children's book author

O 
Odean Smith {born 1996}, West Indies cricket player                                                                                         
Omar Smith (born 1977), American football player
Orland Smith (1825–1903), American Civil War general
Orlando Smith (born 1944), Virgin Islands politician
Ozzie Smith (born 1954), American baseball player

P 
Paris Smith (fl. 2010s), American actress
Paula Smith (born 1957), American tennis player
Pavin Smith (born 1996), American baseball player
Penny Smith (born 1958), English television presenter and newsreader
Percey F. Smith (1867–1956), American mathematician
Peyton Alex Smith (born 1994), American actor and rapper
Phyllida Crowley Smith (born 1968), English ballerina, theatre actress and choreographer
Phyllis Smith (born 1951), American actress and casting associate
Powel J. Smith (1874–1942), American businessman and politician

R 
Rachel Smith (born 1985), Miss USA 2007
Reilly Smith (born 1991), Canadian ice hockey player
Renée Felice Smith (born 1985), American actress
Rhona Smith (fl. 2010s–2020s), British legal academic and UN special rapporteur
Roquan Smith (born 1997), American football player
Eleanor Rosalynn Smith (see Rosalynn Carter; born 1927), the First Lady to Jimmy Carter, 39th president of the United States of America
Rosetta Smith (1770–1775—ca. 1825), Afro-Trinidadian slave trader and entrepreneur
Ruby Smith (1903–1977), American classic female blues singer
Ryan Rowland-Smith (born 1983), Australian baseball player

S 
Saivion Smith (born 1997), American football player
Sammi Smith (1943–2005), American country music singer
Sammie Smith (born 1967), American football player
Sanford W. Smith (1869–1929), New York politician
Saxton Smith (1802–1890), New York politician
Sekou Smith (1972–2021), American sportswriter
Shepard Smith (born 1964), American news anchor
Sheridan Smith (born 1981), English actress
Shi Smith (born 1998), American football player
Skyrocket Smith (1868–1916), American baseball player
Soapy Smith (1860–1898), alias of Jefferson Randolph Smith, infamous 19th century American confidence man.
Sonny Smith (born 1936), American college basketball coach
Sonny Smith (musician) (born 1972), American musician and playwright
Sonya Smith (born 1972), Hispanic and Latino American telenovela actress
 Speedy Smith (born 1993), American basketball player for Hapoel Jerusalem of the Israeli Basketball Premier League
St. Clair Smith (1889–1988), Justice of the South Dakota Supreme Court
Stefan Smith (born 1989), Antiguan footballer
Stow Smith (1864–1963), in full Quinton Stow Smith, South Australian stockbroker philanthropist
Stuff Smith (1909–1967), American jazz violinist
Sutton Smith (born 1996), American football player
S. Talbot Smith (1861–1948), South Australian lawyer and journalist

T 
T. Alford-Smith (1864–1936), British geographer
T. J. Smith (American football) (born 1997), American football player
Tiger Smith (1886–1979), English cricketer
Tina Smith (born 1958), American politician
Tommie Smith (born 1944), American athlete and football player
Torrey Smith (born 1989), American football player
Tremon Smith (born 1996), American football player
Tre'Quan Smith (born 1996), American football player
Trevis Smith (born 1976), Canadian football linebacker
Troy Smith (born 1984), American football player
Tubby Smith (born 1951), American college basketball coach
Truett Smith (1924–2000), American football player
Tyran Smith (born 1974), New Zealand rugby league footballer
Tyreke Smith (born 2000), American football player
Tyron Smith (born 1990), American football player

V 
Verdell Smith (born 1963), American professional boxer
Verdelle Smith (fl. 1960s), American pop singer
Viola Smith (1912–2020), American musician and drummer
Vyncint Smith (born 1996), American football player

W 
Watson Smith (1897–1993), American archaeologist
Willow Smith (born 2000), American entertainer, daughter of actor Will Smith
Wilson Smith (1897–1965), British virologist
Winford Henry Smith (1877–1961), American physician
Winifred Smith (1858–1925), English botanist and educationist
Worthington Curtis Smith (1823–1894), American politician
Worthington George Smith (1835–1917), English mycologist and archaeologist
Wycliffe Smith (born 1948), Prime Minister of Sint Maarten

Y 
Yeardley Smith (born 1964), French-born American actress, voice actress, comedian and writer

Z 
Za'Darius Smith (born 1992), American football player
Zadie Smith (born 1975), English writer
Zhaire Smith (born 1999), American basketball player

Notable individuals with unknown first names
Smith (baseball), baseball player
Smith (Surrey cricketer, 1822), English first-class cricketer who was active in the 1820s
Smith (Cambridge University cricketer, 1820s), English first-class cricketer associated with Cambridge University who was active in the 1820s
Smith (Cambridge University cricketer, 1830s), English first-class cricketer associated with Cambridge University who was active in the 1830s

People with the surname Smith better known by other names
Clifford Smith (born 1971) (Method Man)
James Todd Smith (born 1968) (LL Cool J)
Trevor Tahiem Smith Jr. (born 1972) (Busta Rhymes)
Shaffer Chimere Smith Jr. (born 1979) (Ne-yo)
Jonathan Smith (born 1971) (Lil Jon)
Kim Smith (born 1960) (Kim Wilde)
Tyson Smith (born 1983) (Kenny Omega)
Sterling Richard Smith (fl. 1970s–2010s) (Jandek)
Timothy Jude Smith (born 1982) (Timmy Trumpet)
Delia Dueñas Smith (1966-1985) (Pepsi Paloma)
Gladys Marie Smith (1892-1979) (Mary Pickford)

By title

Fictional Smiths
Adam Smith, title character of the "Adam" episode of the British TV show Torchwood
Agent Smith in The Matrix
Agent Smith in the Flatline mission of Hitman: Blood Money
Burl "Gopher" Smith, Yeoman Purser of the Pacific Princess, in The Love Boat
Beth Smith (née Sanchez), in the Adult Swim cartoon Rick and Morty
Betty Smith, a character in the TV series Littlest Pet Shop
Dudley Smith, LAPD officer in the L.A. Quartet novels by James Ellroy, and the film L.A. Confidential
Eddie Smith, in Pack Up Your Troubles
Eva Smith, in An Inspector Calls by J. B. Priestley
Fritz Smith, in Five Nights at Freddy's 2
Gary Smith, from the 2006 video game Bully
Gus Smith, in The Birth of a Nation
Homer Smith, in the novel, The Lilies of the Field
Jefferson Smith in Mr. Smith Goes to Washington
Jimmy Smith Jnr. in 8 Mile (film)
Captain John Smith in Disney's 1995 animated film Pocahontas
Jonathan Smith, the main character in the series Highway to Heaven
Colonel John "Hannibal" Smith, the main character in the series The A-Team
Leonard Smith, a character in the American sitcom It's Garry Shandling's Show
Margaret Smith, in Regular Show
Morty Smith, titular character of Rick and Morty
Mr. Smith in Call of the Wild
Mr. Smith in (Hey Arnold!)
The otherwise unnamed Mr. Smith and Mrs. Smith in Mr. & Mrs. Smith (TV series)
David Smith and Ann Smith Mr. & Mrs. Smith (1941 film)
John Smith and Jane Smith in Mr. & Mrs. Smith (2005 film)
Psmith in several humorous stories by P. G. Wodehouse
Roger Smith in The Big O (Japanese Anime)
Sarah Jane Smith, fictional character played by Elisabeth Sladen in BBC Television science fiction series Doctor Who
Smith & Smith, sketch comedy series on Canadian television
Shannon Smith, a character played by Stephanie Kaur in the British web series Corner Shop Show.
Snuffy Smith, character in newspaper comic strip
Stan Smith (American Dad!) and family, from American Dad!
 Francine Smith, Hayley Smith (American Dad!), Steve Smith (American Dad!)
Tabitha Smith, a Marvel Comics character
Valentine Michael Smith, the main character in Stranger in a Strange Land
Walter Smith, a character in the Nintendo video game Ninja Gaiden
Winston Smith from Nineteen Eighty-Four
Wesson Smith is the alias of Ramon Lecumberi in the series Tayong Dalawa
Several characters in the Doctor Who universe:
Luke Smith (The Sarah Jane Adventures)
Mickey Smith
Sarah Jane Smith
Sky Smith
The Doctor himself also often goes by the alias of "John Smith"
Doctor Zachary Smith in Lost in Space
All player-controlled characters in the video game Killer7

See also
List of taxonomic authorities named Smith
Smiths of Glastonbury
Smith Family (disambiguation)
 Smith Family (disambiguation)

Occupational surnames
Smith
Smith